Orlando Salvador Jorge Villegas (born 2 February 1991) is a Dominican politician and journalist.

Early life and family
Jorge Villegas was born on 2 February 1991 into a prominent upper class white family from Santiago, Dominican Republic with political connections. His parents are Patricia Villegas, diplomat, and Orlando Jorge Mera, politician and lawyer. He has one sister. His paternal grandfather Salvador Jorge Blanco was President of the Dominican Republic from 1982 to 1986. His maternal great-great-grandfather Faustino de Soto was Senator for El Seibo Province in the 19th century. He is also descended from General Ramón Santana, the twin brother of Lieutenant-General Pedro Santana, 1st President of the Dominican Republic and Marquis of Las Carreras. Jorge Villegas studied social communication at the Pontificia Universidad Católica Madre y Maestra. He has a master from Escuela de Organización Industrial.

Television and radio
Jorge Villegas has been press director of "Antena Latina", director of "Antena Noticias 7".

He has also worked in Telenoticias from 2010.

Since 2020 Jorge works at El Sol de la Mañana.

Political career

Jorge Villegas, a member of the Modern Revolutionary Party, was elected to the Chamber of Deputies of the Dominican Republic for the National District in June 2022 and took office on 16 August.

He is a member of the Parliamentary Group of Dominican-Brazilian Friendship.

References

External links

1991 births
Dominican Republic people of Asturian descent
Dominican Republic people of Canarian descent
Dominican Republic people of French descent
Dominican Republic people of Spanish descent
Dominican Republic Roman Catholics
Living people
Modern Revolutionary Party politicians
People from Santiago de los Caballeros
Members of the Chamber of Deputies of the Dominican Republic
White Dominicans